The Battle of the Unstrut River is said to have been fought in 531 CE near the river Unstrut when the king of Francia,  Theuderic I decisively defeated the Thuringii army led by their king Hermanfrid. Thuringia was subjugated soon after the battle.

References

531
530s conflicts
Unstrut River
Military history of Germany
Unstrut River
6th century in Germany
6th century in Francia